George Clark was the 31st mayor of New Orleans (March 20, 1866 – May 11, 1866).

Mayors of New Orleans
Year of birth missing
Year of death missing